DJ Sabrina the Teenage DJ (abbreviated DJSTTDJ) is a London-based electronic duo composed of two anonymous producers, who use the aliases DJ Sabrina and DJ Salem. The duo's name and their individual aliases are references to the television sitcom Sabrina the Teenage Witch, inspired by a comment on YouTube. They released their debut album, Makin' Magick, in 2017. Their main musical influences include plunderphonics musicians and the 2010s UK outsider house scene.

Influences 
DJ Sabrina started making house music in 2014, influenced by the release of Caustic Window by Aphex Twin. The duo were first exposed to the UK outsider house scene from DJ Seinfeld in 2016 through the music blog aggregator Hype Machine. DJ Sabrina has cited albums such as The Avalanches' Since I Left You and Daft Punk's Homework as major influences. Starting with Enchanted, the duo began to incorporate elements of acid house into their music. DJ Sabrina the Teenage DJ often samples music and television shows from the late 1980s to the early 2000s. DJ Sabrina has stated that her album cover arts are inspired by pixel art of 90's video games.

Career 
DJ Sabrina the Teenage DJ debuted in 2017 with the release of a two-hour-long album, Makin' Magick. Three more albums followed in 2018 and 2019. In 2020, they released Charmed, a three-hour-long album that became "an underground pandemic hit". In April 2021, they released the single "Try Not To Be Afraid" in collaboration with musicians Delilah Brao, Luke Markinson, and Anyela Gómez, which was described as "highly nostalgic". DJ Sabrina The Teenage DJ has since released three further albums in 2021 and 2022.

In addition to their albums and singles, the duo also produces mixtapes, which they call "combinisions", a portmanteau of "combinational composition". They have released three sets of combinisions, each with five to seven mixes. Most combinisions are between 30 and 40 minutes long, but some exceed an hour, and Homeshake is over two hours long.

On August 3, 2022, The 1975 released "Happiness", the second single from their album Being Funny in a Foreign Language, which was written by DJ Sabrina the Teenage DJ with band members Matty Healy and George Daniel.

Discography

Albums

EPs

Singles

Mixtapes 

 Summer Social (2017)
 Homeshake (2017)
 New Atlantic (2017)
 ShopPop (2018)
 Of Three (2020)
 Fuels (2020)
 Belongings, Beginnings (2020)
 Dakota Style (8 February 2021)
 Rise 'n' Star (6 March 2021)
 Life Fast Lite (27 March 2021)

 To the Max (14 April 2021)
 Amity Spirit (17 October 2021)
 Centember Soun-  (23 December 2021)
 Hours, Hers? (2022)
 Space 4 Space (February 2022)
 Prime Architect (2022)
 Harbor Park (2022)
 Exceptional Experience (2022)
 Pseudo Quest (2022)
 S.C.T.C. (31 January 2023)

Official remixes 
 Baltra – "Fade Away"
 Blushed – "Needy"
 DJ Boring – "Winona"
 Harrison BDP – "Watching the World Go By"
 Sandy Hawkins – "Daddy Didn't Want Me to Sing"
 Mall Grab – "Feel U"
 Nelly – "Country Grammar"
 Porter Robinson – "Mirror"
 Ross From Friends – "Talk to Me, You'll Understand"
 DJ Seinfeld – "Time Spent Away From You"
 Spunsugar – "(You Never) Turn Around"
 Superorganism – "Teenager"
 The Westerlies – "Saro"

Other credits 
 The 1975 – "Happiness" – co-writers

See also
 Outsider house

References

External links 
 Official website
 
 
 

English house music duos